"We Danced Together" is a song by English band the Rakes, released in March 2007 as the first single from their second album Ten New Messages. It reached No. 38 on the UK Singles Chart.

Track listings
CD
 "We Danced Together" - 3:53
 "Cold" - 3:16
 "We Danced Together" (SebastiAn Remix) - 3:09
 "We Danced Together" (Jape Remix) - 3:22

7" vinyl
 "We Danced Together" - 3:53
 "Dangerous" - 2:16

References

2007 songs
2007 singles
The Rakes songs
Song recordings produced by Jim Abbiss
V2 Records singles